This list is of the Cultural Properties of Japan designated in the category of  for the Prefecture of Niigata.

National Cultural Properties
As of 1 July 2019, two Important Cultural Properties have been designated, being of national significance.

Prefectural Cultural Properties
As of 1 May 2019, sixteen properties have been designated at a prefectural level.

See also
 Cultural Properties of Japan
 List of National Treasures of Japan (paintings)
 Japanese painting
 List of Historic Sites of Japan (Niigata)

References

External links
  Cultural Properties in Niigata Prefecture

Cultural Properties,Niigata
Cultural Properties,Paintings
Paintings,Niigata
Lists of paintings